Patricio "Paddy" Martinez (1881– August 26, 1969) was an American prospector and shepherd who discovered uranium at Haystack Mesa in the San Juan Basin near Grants, New Mexico, in 1950. This was the first discovery in the Grants Uranium District, and led to a uranium boom that lasted almost 30 years. The San Juan Basin yielded 60% of the uranium in the United States, valued at over $25 billion.

Discovery of uranium in New Mexico

Martinez's discovery, in 1950 on Santa Fe Railroad land, was developed into the Haystack mine. He was hired by the railroad and Anaconda Mining Company as a uranium scout for $400 per month, a good salary then. Following the discovery, the town of Grants became a yellowcake boomtown; its population grew from 2,200 to 50,000 within a few months. The mining boom lasted for decades, until the 1980s when it collapsed. The Santa Fe Railroad continued to pay Martinez $250 per month until the day he died.

After that he explored Haystack Mountain where he made the discovery of high-grade ore. He became nationally known for his discovery.

Personal life
Martinez was born in the village of Pinedale, New Mexico. He and his wife Mary had 14 children.

Martinez, a Navajo of Mexican descent, and a native New Mexican, became famous for his discovery. He was the subject of feature articles in Time, Life, True West and Reader's Digest magazines. Martinez was fluent in the Navajo, Laguna (Keresan), Spanish and English languages. He was a medicine man and a leader in his community.

Martinez also worked as a law officer on the Navajo reservation, ran a mountain sheep camp and worked as a labor recruiter for carrot farms.

His tombstone at Grants Memorial Cemetery simply reads, "Paddy Martinez 1881 - 1969 Uranium Pioneer." His grave is nearby Paddy Martinez Park, where children play.

Legacy
Martinez was inducted into the National Mining Hall of Fame in 1992.

References

National Mining Hall of Fame inductee bio of Martinez

External links
Abe Peña's memories of Paddy Martinez 
1950 article on Martinez, Time magazine

1881 births
1969 deaths
American miners
Uranium mining in the United States
American prospectors
People from Grants, New Mexico
Navajo people
American people of Mexican descent
Shepherds
Folk healers
20th-century Native Americans